Revolution Day refers to the public holiday in Egypt on 23 July, the anniversary of the Egyptian Revolution of 1952 which led to the declaration of the modern republic of Egypt, ending the period of the Kingdom of Egypt. It is the biggest secular public holiday in Egypt and is considered the National Day of Egypt.

Annual celebrations marking the Revolution begin on the preceding evening, as the evening of 23 July 1952 was when the Free Officers Movement led by Mohamed Naguib and Gamal Abdel Nasser commenced the military coup d'état that launched the Revolution, and ultimately led to the abdication of King Farouk, the penultimate King of Egypt and the Sudan. The public holiday itself is characterised by large and elaborate celebrations, including military parades and televised concerts with heavily nationalistic themes.

See also
Revolution Day in other countries.

References 

Egyptian Revolution of 1952
Public holidays in Egypt
National days
July observances
Summer events in Egypt